William Baird McIlwaine (October 4, 1854 – August 11, 1930) was an American politician who served in the Virginia House of Delegates and Virginia Senate.

References

External links 

1854 births
1930 deaths
Democratic Party members of the Virginia House of Delegates
19th-century American politicians
20th-century American politicians